Anders Lindbäck (born 1988), Swedish professional ice hockey goaltender 
Antonio Lindbäck (born 1985), Brazilian motorcycle speedway rider
Peter Lindbäck (born 1955), Finish governor of the Åland Islands 
Harry Lindbäck (born 1926), Swedish canoer

See also
 Lindback Award, attributed by the Lindback Foundation